John Menick (born 1976) is an artist and writer working primarily in the moving image, fiction, and essay form.

Education 
Menick received his BFA from the Cooper Union for the Advancement of Science and Art.

Work 
Menick's work focuses primarily on the history and circulation of images. His experimental videos and audio works have been exhibited and screened at documenta (13); MoMA PS1; Palais de Tokyo; the International Film Festival, Rotterdam; Wattis Institute for Contemporary Arts; Witte de With Center for Contemporary Art; among other venues. His short fiction as well as his writings on cinema, politics, and technology have been published in Mousse Magazine, N+1, BOMB, Spike Art Quarterly, Frieze, Art in America, and Witte de With Review. In 2012, as part of documenta (13), he published his first collection of fiction and essays, A Report on the City. His videos are included in the collection of the Kadist Art Foundation, as well as the collection of Isabelle and Jean-Conrad Lemaître. He has been a visiting professor of film and video at the Cooper Union.

References

External links 

 Official Website
 Interview with John Menick

1976 births
Living people
Cooper Union alumni
21st-century American short story writers
American male short story writers
American video artists
American male artists
21st-century American artists
21st-century American male writers
American magazine writers